The Consensus 1994 College Basketball All-American team, as determined by aggregating the results of four major All-American teams.  To earn "consensus" status, a player must win honors from a majority of the following teams: the Associated Press, the USBWA, The United Press International and the National Association of Basketball Coaches.

1994 Consensus All-America team

Individual All-America teams

AP Honorable Mention

Adrian Autry, Syracuse
Randolph Childress, Wake Forest
Erwin Claggett, Saint Louis
Dan Cross, Florida
Jevon Crudup, Missouri
Bill Curley, Boston College
Michael Finley, Wisconsin
Travis Ford, Kentucky
James Forrest, Georgia Tech
Eddie Jones, Temple
Voshon Lenard, Minnesota
Billy McCaffrey, Vanderbilt
Jim McIlvaine, Marquette
Aaron McKie, Temple
Lawrence Moten, Syracuse
Ed O'Bannon, UCLA
Cherokee Parks, Duke
Wesley Person, Auburn
Derrick Phelps, North Carolina
Eric Piatkowski, Nebraska
Shawn Respert, Michigan State
Lou Roe, Massachusetts
Carlos Rogers, Tennessee State
Jervaughn Scales, Southern
Joe Smith, Maryland
Michael Smith, Providence
Damon Stoudamire, Arizona
Bob Sura, Florida State
Deon Thomas, Illinois
Scotty Thurman, Arkansas
Gary Trent, Ohio
Monty Williams, Notre Dame
Sharone Wright, Clemson

References

NCAA Men's Basketball All-Americans
All-Americans